Borrowed is a 2022 drama film directed by Carlos Rafael Betancourt and Oscar Ernesto Ortega. The film explores the relationship between two men living in South Florida. Borrowed stars Jonathan Del Arco and Héctor Medina, and had its world premiere at the 2022 Miami International Film Festival.

Synopsis
The story centers around the relationship of David, a painter living an isolated life in the Florida Keys with sophisticated and openly gay Justin, from Miami. What starts as a date and possibly posing for a painting unravels into a physiological struggle for power and freedom when David decides to “borrow” Justin against his will.

Cast
 Jonathan Del Arco – David
 Hector Médina – Justin

Release 
The film premiered at the 2022 Miami International Film Festival. Borrowed received positive critical reception. It holds a 83% "Fresh" rating on Rotten Tomatoes based on six reviews.

References

External links
 
 
 

2022 films
2022 LGBT-related films
American drama films
Films set in Florida
2020s Spanish-language films
2020s English-language films
2020s American films